Danielle May Laidley (born Dean James Laidley; 27 March 1967) is a former Australian rules football coach and player, who played for the West Coast Eagles and North Melbourne in the Australian Football League (AFL) from 1987 to 1997, including in North Melbourne's 1996 premiership team. She was the coach of North Melbourne from 2003 to 2009.

Born male, Laidley played and coached in men's AFL. In November 2020, her lawyer announced that she had transitioned to female and wished to be referred to as Dani.

Early life
Laidley grew up in Balga, Western Australia, a working-class northern suburb of Perth.

Lightly built, Laidley first played senior football at the West Perth Football Club in the West Australian Football League and she was recruited to be part of the West Coast Eagles' inaugural VFL squad in 1987.

VFL/AFL playing career

West Coast Eagles (1987–1992)
Laidley made her VFL debut for the West Coast Eagles in Round 1, 1987, against Richmond at Subiaco Oval. As an aggressive half-back line player and known as "The Junkyard Dog", Laidley was known for her commitment to the contest and to winning the ball. Her career suffered a major setback during the 1990 season when she required a knee reconstruction and found it hard to break back into the team, missing West Coast's 1992 premiership win.

Laidley played a total of 52 games and kicked 11 goals for West Coast Eagles from 1987 until 1992.

North Melbourne (1993–1997)
At the end of 1992, Laidley was traded to North Melbourne. A trademark of her play was the execution of the strategy of either kicking out or receiving uncontested a short kick-out to the back pocket, a strategy which was later widely adopted by other clubs. Laidley was also part of the North Melbourne premiership side in 1996.

Laidley played a total of 99 games and kicked 4 goals for North Melbourne Football Club from 1993 until 1997.

Coaching career

Early career (1998–2002)
After retiring from the AFL, Laidley took up coaching, beginning with the Weston Creek team in the AFL Canberra competition.

Her first AFL coaching role was with Collingwood as an assistant coach under Mick Malthouse, where she was involved in the club's 2002 AFL Grand Final loss.

North Melbourne senior coach (2003–2009)
After the resignation of Denis Pagan as senior coach, Laidley was recruited as the senior coach of the Kangaroos for the 2003 season. In her first two years, the team finished 10th. She coached the Kangaroos to the finals for her first time as coach in the 2005 season, but the club was defeated by Port Adelaide in an elimination final. In the 2006 season they regressed and finished 14th.

Laidley's ferocity as a player transferred into her coaching style, with her team said to embody the "Shinboner Spirit" of determination and never giving up. She was also seen on occasion to be aggressive towards her playing group.

Laidley took North Melbourne to the finals for the second time in 2007. At the end of 2007, her contract was due for renewal. Despite Melbourne Football Club making advances to secure her as coach,  Laidley's contract with North Melbourne was renewed for two years. She took North Melbourne to the finals again in 2008.

After a mid-season review in 2009 and following a string of losses, Laidley resigned as senior coach of North Melbourne on 16 June 2009, one round before what would have been her 150th game as coach. Laidley was replaced by assistant coach Darren Crocker as caretaker senior coach of North Melbourne for the rest of the 2009 season.

Port Adelaide career (2010–2011)
In September 2009, Laidley joined the coaching group at the Port Adelaide Football Club.

After one season as an assistant to Mark Williams and later Matthew Primus, Laidley announced that she would return to Melbourne in 2011 for family reasons, but said she was available to work as an opposition scout and analysis based in Melbourne for Port Adelaide. However, on 27 October 2010, Port Adelaide announced that she would continue on as an assistant coach based four days in Adelaide and three days in Melbourne a week in the 2011 season. She interviewed for the Essendon Football Club senior coach position when it was left vacant by the sacking of Matthew Knights but was unsuccessful.

St Kilda career (2011–2013)

In early November 2011, Laidley was announced as the new midfield coach of the St Kilda Football Club. Of the move, St Kilda's head of football, Chris Pelchen, said that Laidley: "has a wealth of knowledge as a former player and coach in his own right. His experience will genuinely assist the development of the whole player list at the Saints."

Carlton career (2013–2015) 
Laidley signed with Carlton as midfield assistant coach on 31 October 2013. With the appointment of Brendon Bolton in 2015, Laidley left Carlton.

Statistics

Playing statistics

|-
|- style="background-color: #EAEAEA"
! scope="row" style="text-align:center" | 1987
|style="text-align:center;"|
| 15 || 10 || 2 || 5 || 119 || 24 || 143 || 37 || 6 || 0.2 || 0.5 || 11.9 || 2.4 || 14.3 || 3.7 || 0.6 || 0
|-
! scope="row" style="text-align:center" | 1988
|style="text-align:center;"|
| 15 || 11 || 6 || 4 || 139 || 29 || 168 || 44 || 11 || 0.5 || 0.4 || 12.6 || 2.6 || 15.3 || 4.0 || 1.0 || 0
|- style="background-color: #EAEAEA"
! scope="row" style="text-align:center" | 1989
|style="text-align:center;"|
| 15 || 10 || 0 || 3 || 116 || 60 || 176 || 40 || 15 || 0.0 || 0.3 || 11.6 || 6.0 || 17.6 || 4.0 || 1.5 || 0
|-
! scope="row" style="text-align:center" | 1990
|style="text-align:center;"|
| 15 || 7 || 1 || 0 || 93 || 45 || 138 || 23 || 1 || 0.1 || 0.0 || 13.3 || 6.4 || 19.7 || 3.3 || 0.1 || 5
|- style="background-color: #EAEAEA"
! scope="row" style="text-align:center" | 1991
|style="text-align:center;"|
| 15 || 0 || — || — || — || — || — || — || — || — || — || — || — || — || — || — || —
|-
! scope="row" style="text-align:center" | 1992
|style="text-align:center;"|
| 15 || 14 || 2 || 5 || 158 || 90 || 248 || 30 || 13 || 0.1 || 0.4 || 11.3 || 6.4 || 17.7 || 2.1 || 0.9 || 2
|- style="background-color: #EAEAEA"
! scope="row" style="text-align:center" | 1993
|style="text-align:center;"|
| 7 || 17 || 1 || 2 || 209 || 60 || 269 || 35 || 23 || 0.1 || 0.1 || 12.3 || 3.5 || 15.8 || 2.1 || 1.4 || 6
|-
! scope="row" style="text-align:center" | 1994
|style="text-align:center;"|
| 7 || 24 || 0 || 0 || 302 || 137 || 439 || 77 || 16 || 0.0 || 0.0 || 12.6 || 5.7 || 18.3 || 3.2 || 0.7 || 4
|- style="background-color: #EAEAEA"
! scope="row" style="text-align:center" | 1995
|style="text-align:center;"|
| 7 || 23 || 0 || 2 || 272 || 131 || 403 || 82 || 24 || 0.0 || 0.1 || 11.8 || 5.7 || 17.5 || 3.6 || 1.0 || 3
|-
|style="text-align:center;background:#afe6ba;"|1996†
|style="text-align:center;"|
| 7 || 24 || 2 || 1 || 240 || 130 || 370 || 64 || 29 || 0.1 || 0.0 || 10.0 || 5.4 || 15.4 || 2.7 || 1.2 || 0
|- style="background-color: #EAEAEA"
! scope="row" style="text-align:center" | 1997
|style="text-align:center;"|
| 7 || 11 || 1 || 0 || 78 || 32 || 110 || 24 || 10 || 0.1 || 0.0 || 7.1 || 2.9 || 10.0 || 2.2 || 0.9 || 0
|- class="sortbottom"
! colspan=3| Career
! 151
! 15
! 22
! 1726
! 738
! 2464
! 456
! 148
! 0.1
! 0.1
! 11.4
! 4.9
! 16.3
! 3.0
! 1.0
! 20
|}

Coaching statistics

|- style="background-color: #EAEAEA"
! scope="row" style="text-align:center; font-weight:normal" | 2003
|style="text-align:center;"|
| 22 || 11 || 10 || 1 || 52.3% || 10 || 16
|-
! scope="row" style="text-align:center; font-weight:normal" | 2004
|style="text-align:center;"|
| 22 || 10 || 12 || 0 || 45.5% || 10 || 16
|- style="background-color: #EAEAEA"
! scope="row" style="text-align:center; font-weight:normal" | 2005
|style="text-align:center;"|
| 23 || 13 || 10 || 0 || 56.5% || 5 || 16
|-
! scope="row" style="text-align:center; font-weight:normal" | 2006
|style="text-align:center;"|
| 22 || 7 || 15 || 0 || 31.8% || 14 || 16
|- style="background-color: #EAEAEA"
! scope="row" style="text-align:center; font-weight:normal" | 2007
|style="text-align:center;"|
| 25 || 15 || 10 || 0 || 60.0% || 4 || 16
|-
! scope="row" style="text-align:center; font-weight:normal" | 2008
|style="text-align:center;"|
| 23 || 12 || 10 || 1 || 54.3% || 7 || 16
|- style="background-color: #EAEAEA"
! scope="row" style="text-align:center; font-weight:normal" | 2009*
|style="text-align:center;"|
| 12 || 4 || 8 || 0 || 33.3% || 13 || 16
|- class="sortbottom"
! colspan=2| Career totals
! 149
! 72
! 75
! 2
! 49.0%
! colspan=2|
|}

*Laidley resigned as coach in 2009. Darren Crocker coached the club for the remainder of the season.

Controversies 
During a 2006 match against St Kilda, a Kangaroos supporter had a confrontation with Laidley during a period of consistently poor performances. The supporter twice made remarks to which Laidley responded with an honest summation "we are all hurting", later inviting the supporter to the club rooms to see how badly the players were feeling due to their onfield performance. The footage was captured on television and broadcast nationally. The supporter died by suicide later that night, unrelated to the incident with Laidley.

In 2007, former Kangaroos' star Wayne Carey criticised Laidley and argued that another former teammate, John Longmire, should replace her as Laidley's contract was due for renewal at the end of 2007. After a forthright response by Laidley that referenced Carey's personal scandals, Carey responded by describing her as arrogant.

In May 2020, Laidley was arrested and charged with one count of stalking. She did not apply for bail. Laidley was allegedly found with 0.43 grams of methamphetamine in her bra at the time of their arrest. In November, she was placed into a diversion program and given an "adjourned undertaking with no conviction recorded" on the stalking charge. A Victoria Police officer allegedly distributed photos of Laidley in women's clothing, taken while she was in custody. In December, the officer was charged with unauthorised access and disclosure of police information as well as misconduct in public office.

Personal life
Laidley commenced a gender transition in December 2019.

Since 2021, Laidley has become involved with the North Melbourne Football Club again, tossing the coin at the 2022 Pride Round game against GWS Giants and attending other club events with North Melbourne players and management.

References

External links

Dani Laidley's WAFL playing statistics

West Coast Eagles players
North Melbourne Football Club players
North Melbourne Football Club Premiership players
North Melbourne Football Club coaches
Western Australian State of Origin players
West Perth Football Club players
1967 births
Living people
Australian rules footballers from Perth, Western Australia
LGBT players of Australian rules football
Transgender sportswomen
Transgender women
One-time VFL/AFL Premiership players
21st-century LGBT people